This decade witnessed the continuing decline of the Achaemenid Empire, fierce warfare amongst the Greek city-states during the Peloponnesian War, the ongoing Warring States period in Zhou dynasty China, and the closing years of the Olmec civilization (lasting from c. 1200–400 BC) in modern-day Mexico.

Significant people
 Euphemus of Athens, Archon of Athens. In office 417-416 BC
 Euripides of Athens, playwright
 Socrates of Athens, philosopher
 Sophocles of Athens, playwright
 Thucydides of Athens, historian and author of the History of the Peloponnesian War
 Hannibal Mago, King of Carthage, r. 440–406 BC
 Weilieh, Zhou dynasty king of China, r. 425–402 BC
 Tharrhypas, King of Epirus, r. 430–390 BC
 Perdiccas II, King of Macedon, r. 454–413 BC
 Archelaus I, King of Macedon, r. 413–399 BC
 Mahapadma Nanda, King (and founder) of the Nanda Dynasty in Magadha (in Ancient India), r. c. 420–362 BC
 Kosho, legendary Emperor of Japan, r. 475–393 BC
 Amanineteyerike, King of Kush r. 431–405 BC
 Darius II, King of the Achaemenid Persian Empire r. 423–404 BC
 Amyrtaeus of Egypt, Anti-Achaemenid rebel and future Pharaoh of Egypt
 Joiada of Judah, High-Priest of Israel, held position 433–410 BC
 Johanan of Judah, High-priest of Israel, held position 410–371 BC
 Malachi of Judah, prophet (according to Bible)
 Tissaphernes of Persia, Satrap of Lydia and Caria
 Abdemon, King of Salamis, r. 420–410 BC
 Evagoras, King of Salamis, r. 410–374 BC
 Pleistoanax (Agaid king r. 458–401 BC) and Agis II (Eurypontid king r. 427–400 BC), co-kings of Sparta.
 Seuthes I, King of Thrace, r. 424–410 BC
 Amadocus I, King of Thrace, r. 410–390 BC

Contemporaries of future importance
 Artaxerxes of Persia, Achaemenid prince and future King of Persia
 Cyrus the Younger of Persia, Achaemenid prince and satrap
 Plato of Athens, student of Socrates and future philosopher
 Xenophon of Athens, soldier and future writer of Anabasis

References